Father There Is Only One 2 is a 2020 Spanish comedy film directed by Santiago Segura, which also stars in alongside Toni Acosta, Leo Harlem, and Silvia Abril. It is a sequel to Father There Is Only One and it was followed by Padre no hay más que uno 3. It was the highest-grossing Spanish film of 2020.

Plot 
Although Javier seems to have now everything under control in the family, things do no stay that way. A new pregnancy in the family and the arrival of the mother-in-law ensue.

Cast 

Cristina Pardo, Nuria Fergó, Lorena Berdún, Sara Escudero, María del Monte and Sieteex make cameo performances.

Production 
The screenplay was penned by Santiago Segura and Marta González de la Vega. The film is a Bowfinger International Pictures, Atresmedia Cine and Mamá se fue de viaje la película AIE. Shooting wrapped on 4 March 2020. Shooting locations included the Madrid region and the provinces of Guadalajara and Toledo.

Release  
Distributed by Sony Pictures, the film was theatrically released on 29 July 2020 (a Wednesday). The film grossed €2.14 million in its first 5 days, with some theatres still closed because of COVID-19. It became the highest-grossing Spanish release of 2020, with €12.9 million.

Reception 
Raquel Hernández Luján of HobbyConsolas scored out of 45 out of 100 points ("bad"), considering that the sequel "repeats all the problems of the first film", but with the aggravating factor that it has nothing to tell, only rebounding a little with the "extremely powerful" comic flair of Loles León.

Fausto Fernández of Fotogramas rated the film 4 out of 5 stars, deeming it to be a superior sequel, highlighting Loles León's performance, which the reviewer found reminiscent of Ethel Merman's in It's a Mad, Mad, Mad, Mad World.

Andrea G. Bermejo of Cinemanía rated the film 3 out of 5 stars, finding the sequel to be less fun than the first film, even if Loles León's comic flair is all over the place.

See also 
 List of Spanish films of 2020

References 

Films scored by Roque Baños
Films shot in the Community of Madrid
Films shot in the province of Guadalajara
Films shot in the province of Toledo
Spanish comedy films
2020 comedy films
2020s Spanish-language films
Bowfinger International Pictures films
Atresmedia Cine films
2020s Spanish films
Spanish pregnancy films